Alejandro Rodríguez Luis (born 23 January 1957) is a Mexican politician from the Ecologist Green Party of Mexico. From 2008 to 2009 he served as Deputy of the LX Legislature of the Mexican Congress representing Durango.

References

1957 births
Living people
Politicians from Jalisco
Ecologist Green Party of Mexico politicians
21st-century Mexican politicians
Deputies of the LX Legislature of Mexico
Members of the Chamber of Deputies (Mexico) for Durango